Eidelweiss is a village district in the town of Madison, Carroll County, New Hampshire, United States. It consists of a residential area in the northeastern part of Madison, surrounding three water bodies: Pea Porridge Pond, Middle Pea Porridge Pond, and Little Pea Porridge Pond. The village district is bordered on the west by New Hampshire Route 113, which leads south to the center of Madison and north into Conway.

External links 
 Village District of Eidelweiss, official website
 Eidelweiss Property Owners' Association
 

Unincorporated communities in New Hampshire
Unincorporated communities in Carroll County, New Hampshire